This is a list of listed buildings in Midlothian. The list is split out by parish.

 List of listed buildings in Bonnyrigg And Lasswade, Midlothian
 List of listed buildings in Borthwick, Midlothian
 List of listed buildings in Carrington, Midlothian
 List of listed buildings in Cockpen, Midlothian
 List of listed buildings in Cranston, Midlothian
 List of listed buildings in Crichton, Midlothian
 List of listed buildings in Dalkeith, Midlothian
 List of listed buildings in Fala And Soutra, Midlothian
 List of listed buildings in Glencorse, Midlothian
 List of listed buildings in Humbie, Midlothian
 List of listed buildings in Inveresk, Midlothian
 List of listed buildings in Lasswade, Midlothian
 List of listed buildings in Loanhead, Midlothian
 List of listed buildings in Newbattle, Midlothian
 List of listed buildings in Newton, Midlothian
 List of listed buildings in Penicuik, Midlothian
 List of listed buildings in Temple, Midlothian

Midlothian